Elvis Recorded Live on Stage in Memphis is a live album by American singer and musician Elvis Presley, released by RCA Records in July 1974. It was recorded on March 20 of the same year at the Mid-South Coliseum in Memphis, Tennessee, Presley's hometown. The cover features a photograph of Presley's home, Graceland.

Presley earned his third Grammy Award for this album's performance of "How Great Thou Art" (he had previously won for the album of the same title). The album was certified gold by the Recording Industry Association of America on July 15, 1999.

Content
The album was recorded on the same day as his Good Times album was released. Elvis Recorded Live on Stage in Memphis was Presley's fifth live album in less than five years and the last to be issued in his lifetime.

In the United States, Elvis Recorded Live on Stage in Memphis topped Cashboxs Country album chart, reached number 2 on Billboards Country chart, and reached the top 40 of the Top LPs & Tape listings (now known as the Billboard 200). It was Presley's last album to reach the top 40 until Moody Blue in 1977. Although the live album was not a major commercial success, it did produce the singer's third and final Grammy Award winner, "How Great Thou Art", which won for best inspirational performance. Two other gospel songs, "Why Me Lord" and "Help Me", are given an inspired performance. Another highlight is the Sun years classic "Trying to Get to You", a favorite live choice of Presley's, which suggested that he still had the power to belt it out when he chose to.

The live recording of "Let Me Be There" from this album was later used as filler on Presley's final studio album, Moody Blue. It was also issued as a promotional single in 1974, with the same song on both sides (mono and stereo).

Reissues
In 2004, FTD Records re-released Elvis Recorded Live on Stage in Memphis containing the entire concert, which had included performances of songs such as "Suspicious Minds" and "Polk Salad Annie" that had been omitted from the 1974 LP to avoid repetition with Presley's previous live albums. On March 17, 2014, close to the 40th anniversary of the concert, Sony/RCA Legacy re-released the album as a two-CD set. Disc one corresponds with the FTD version, in that it features the complete show from the Mid-South Coliseum. The second disc consists of a near-identical concert recorded at the Richmond Coliseum just two days earlier; as it had a similar setlist, this show is known as the "test run" for the Memphis concert, but was recorded only in mono. Disc two also includes several recently rediscovered studio rehearsal recordings from August 1974. On release, the two-CD set re-entered the UK Albums Chart at number 74.

Track listing

Original LP release

Follow That Dream reissue

2014 reissue

Disc 1 
Same as Follow That Dream 2004 issue

Disc 2 
All tracks previously unissued

Personnel
Elvis Presley - vocals, acoustic guitar, executive producer
James Burton - lead guitar
Charlie Hodge - acoustic guitar, backing vocals
John Wilkinson - rhythm guitar
Glen D. Hardin - piano
J.D. Sumner and the Stamps - backing vocals
Kathy Westmoreland - backing vocals
The Sweet Inspirations - backing vocals
Duke Bardwell - bass guitar
Ronnie Tutt - drums
Technical
Gus Mossler, Larry Schnapf, Mike Moran, Ronnie Olson - engineers

References

External links

1974 live albums
Elvis Presley live albums
RCA Records live albums